The 1981 NCAA Men's Division I Outdoor Track and Field Championships were contested June 2−6 at the 59th annual NCAA-sanctioned track meet to determine the individual and team national champions of men's collegiate Division I outdoor track and field events in the United States. 

This was the final meet before the introduction of women's events at the 1982 championship

This year's meet was contested at Bernie Moore Track Stadium at Louisiana State University in Baton Rouge, Louisiana. This was the Tigers' second time hosting the event and the first since 1973. 

UTEP finished atop the team standings for the fourth consecutive year and, therefore, claimed their fifth national title.

Team result 
 Note: Top 10 only
 (H) = Hosts

References

NCAA Men's Outdoor Track and Field Championship
NCAA Division I Outdoor Track and Field Championships
NCAA
NCAA Division I Outdoor Track and Field Championships